Gordon Allan Lawrie (24 May 1885 – 10 May 1915) was a Scottish professional footballer who played in the Scottish League for Aberdeen as a forward.

Personal life 
Lawrie was born in Aberdeen, the son of John Lawrie and Jane Allan Lawrie. Soon after the outbreak of the First World War in August 1914, Lawrie enlisted as a private in the Queen's Own Cameron Highlanders. He was serving in 'D' Company, 2nd Battalion when he was killed in Flanders on 10 May 1915. He is commemorated on the Menin Gate.

Career statistics

References

External links

Scottish footballers
Aberdeen F.C. players
1886 births
1915 deaths
British Army personnel of World War I
Queen's Own Cameron Highlanders soldiers
Association football forwards
British military personnel killed in World War I